Alberto Giurioli (born 24 July 1991) is an Italian pianist and composer, based in London.

Born in Badia Polesine, Italy (a municipality in Rovigo), Giurioli is the son of Pietro Giurioli and Alice Fasolin.  He began studying piano at age 4 and studied at the music school "Libera Espressione Musicale".  He has also studied at the "Cat Sound Studio" under Patrizia Arduini and Mario Marcassa, and at the conservatory of music "Conservatorio di Musica Francesco Venezze" in Rovigo.  He earned a degree in International Economics from University of Padua.

Giurioli also plays keyboards, electric guitar, bass guitar and drums.  He has appeared on television on programmes such as 7 Gold, and performed in London on public street pianos.  Giurioli makes his home in London.

Giurioli's first album "Ali" was released in July 2011 through Cat Sound Records.

After moving to London in 2015 he began collaborating with the orchestrator Geoff Lawson, who has worked on films such Star Wars: Solo, Thor: Ragnarok, Black Panther and recent albums from Voces 8, Katherine Jenkins, and Gareth Malone, deepening his understanding of orchestration in the Neo-classical genre.

He has performed as a guest for Sofar Sound in London. His collaboration with Classic FM led to a performance as part of Global's Make Some Noise in October 2017, performing at Steinway and Sons Hall in December 2017, and live streaming performances on the public pianos dotted around London's railway stations on Classic FM's social media, earning an international audience. His track ‘Tutto E’ Bellissimo’ debuted on Classic FM in December 2017 and reached number 1 on the iTunes Classical Charts in the U.K. as well as in Spain. This led to him being inducted into the Classic FM Hall of Fame as the youngest composer ever  and being named one of the 30 brilliant classical musicians under 30 by British cellist and conductor Julian Lloyd Webber in 2021.

In November 2018, Nightfall release, his new single premiered on Classic Fm Radio brought him the 3rd rank in the Uk iTunes Chart and 3rd in Spain. The track has been featured on BBC.

In January 2019 he had the opportunity to record at the BBC studio Maida Vale MV4 (a studio where The Beatles, Jimi Hendrix, Led Zeppelin recorded) four tracks in acoustic which has been aired during Alberto's interview made by Janice Long.

In May 2019 he performed at the Swiss Church in London and at the Teatro Sociale in Italy having two sold out.

Discography

Solo Releases 
2011: Ali (Album)
2014: Time Goes By (Single)
2016: One Note (Single - piano, electronic, orchestra) · reached 1 million plays on Spotify (22 August 2016)
2017: Following Yourself
2017: Tutto è Bellissimo
2018: Nightfall

Synchronisations 
2012: "Overture" for the musical comedy Stravaganza (written by Dacia Maraini)
2013: La7 (Italian National Television)
2013: "Never-ending dream" used in "Ghost of Christmas Present" by Klaire De Lys
2014: Composition "London Calling" used in the book trailer of "L’accarezzatrice" written by Italian actress Giorgia Würth
2014: "Following Yourself" used in Deejay TV's documentary "Yukon Blues" (Italian national TV)
2014: "Time Goes By" used in "Knud Speed Drawing" by Klaire De Lys
2016: Weav (Little Cute Apps by Lars Rasmussen): Adaptive Remixes of "One Note" and "Following Yourself"
2016: SMU: SoA Admission Video (Singapore)
2016: Éen - Het Goeie Leven (Belgian TV Show)
2016: "Time goes by" in Randy Tan's travelogue "Explore Lampung - Pulau Pisang" (Indonesia)
2017: "Tutto e' bellissimo" in Porsche Auf Sylt (Germany)

References

External links 

 
 Knewyu interviews Alberto Giurioli by Nadine Hamilton (15 July 2016)
(Italian) Polesano al Piano Nella Metro di Londra in Il Gazzettino (11 October 2015)
 (Italian) Alberto Giurioli "Le Mie Emozioni Diventano Musica" by Roberto Giannese on Radio Kolbe, Italy (21 April 2014)
 Marcus Maschwitz Portrait shoot with Alberto Giurioli by Marcus Maschwitz (28 September 2016)
 'How to win fame on a railway station piano'.  Slipped Disc blog, September 2015

21st-century classical composers
Italian classical composers
Italian male pianists
1991 births
Living people
21st-century pianists
21st-century Italian male musicians